NGC 4089 is an elliptical galaxy located 340 million light-years away in the constellation Coma Berenices. NGC 4089 was discovered by astronomer Heinrich d'Arrest on May 4, 1864 and is a member of the NGC 4065 Group.

The galaxy hosts an AGN.

References

External links
 

4089
038298
Coma Berenices
Astronomical objects discovered in 1864
Elliptical galaxies
NGC 4065 Group
Active galaxies
Discoveries by Heinrich Louis d'Arrest